Kuusalu Parish is a rural municipality in northern Estonia, the largest in Harju County. The population density is 9.7 inhabitants per km2.

A significant share of the municipality's territory (between 40% and 60%) is covered by protected areas, as large parts of the Lahemaa National Park and Põhja-Kõrvemaa Nature Reserve are situated there. The eastern part of the municipality is home to the largest military training area in Estonia, the central training area of Estonian Defence Forces.

The administrative centre of the municipality is Kiiu. There is a total of 3 small boroughs — Kuusalu (1225 inhabitants), Kiiu (893 inhabitants) and Kolga (501 inhabitants) — and 64 villages in Kuusalu Parish: Allika, Andineeme, Aru, Haavakannu, Hara, Hirvli, Ilmastalu, Joaveski, Juminda, Kaberla, Kahala, Kalme, Kasispea, Kemba, Kiiu-Aabla, Kodasoo, Koitjärve, Kolga-Aabla, Kolgaküla, Kolgu, Kõnnu, Kosu, Kotka, Külmaallika, Kupu, Kursi, Kuusalu, Leesi, Liiapeksi, Loksa, Mäepea, Murksi, Mustametsa, Muuksi, Nõmmeveski, Pala, Pärispea, Parksi, Pedaspea, Põhja, Pudisoo, Rehatse, Rummu, Salmistu, Saunja, Sigula, Sõitme, Soorinna, Suru, Suurpea, Tammispea, Tammistu, Tapurla, Tõreska, Tsitre, Turbuneeme, Uuri, Vahastu, Valgejõe, Valkla, Vanaküla, Vihasoo, Viinistu, Virve.

The current mayor is Terje Kraanvelt.

Religion

Gallery

See also
Kuusalu JK Rada

References

External links
Official website (available only in Estonian)